The Hurja-class motor torpedo boats (English: Fierce) or H class was an Italian-designed class of Finnish motor torpedo boats, seeing service with the Finnish Navy during World War II. The five boats of the H class were built by Cantieri Baglietto in Genoa, Italy. The ships were converted into patrol boats in 1949, in accordance with the Paris peace treaty and their torpedo armament, forbidden by the treaty, was removed. The H class were stricken from the naval vessel register in 1963.

Design and description
The Hurja class were a class of Italian-designed motor torpedo boat. They were propelled by two Isotta Fraschini petrol engines creating . The Hurjas were armed with a single  Madsen gun, two  guns, two  torpedo tubes and two depth charge racks.

Vessels of the class

Construction and career
All four vessels were constructed at Cantieri Baglietto in Genoa, Italy. The Paris Peace Treaty of 1947 was signed following the end of World War II, and Finland was prohibited by the treaty from having torpedo-carrying vessels. The ships were converted into motor gunboats in 1949, in accordance with the treaty. They were rearmed with two 20 mm guns and two 13 mm guns. They were stricken in 1963.

Notes

Citations

References
 
 

Torpedo boats of the Finnish Navy
Ships built in Italy
Torpedo boat classes
Military boats